William G. Logan was a Scottish amateur football outside left and right back who played in the Scottish League for St Bernard's and Queen's Park.

Personal life 
Logan served as a gunner in the Royal Field Artillery during the First World War.

Career statistics

References

Year of birth missing
Scottish footballers
Scottish Football League players
British Army personnel of World War I
Association football outside forwards
Queen's Park F.C. players
Royal Field Artillery soldiers
Place of death missing
St Bernard's F.C. players
Association football fullbacks